Volume 2: High and Inside is the second album from The Baseball Project, released by Yep Roc Records on March 1, 2011.

Critical reception
Volume 2 received generally favorable reviews from critics.

Track listing
"1976" (Wynn/Buck) – 3:37
"Panda and The Freak" (McCaughey) – 2:40
"Fair Weather Fans" (Wynn/McCaughey/Pitmon) – 3:37
"Don't Call Them Twinkies" (Wynn/Finn) – 4:26
"Chin Music" (Wynn) – 3:47
"Buckner's Bolero" (McCaughey) – 5:45
"Tony (Boston's Chosen Son)" (Wynn) – 3:09
"Ichiro Goes to the Moon" (McCaughey) – 2:06
"The Straw that Stirs the Drink" (Wynn) – 4:00
"Look Out Mom" (McCaughey) – 3:31
"Pete Rose Way" (McCaughey) – 2:04
"Twilight of My Career" (Wynn) – 3:32
"Here Lies Carl Mays" (McCaughey) – 4:08
iTunes Store bonus tracks
"Dizzy Dean – 2:57
"The Magic Mitt of Jason Byles" – 1:51

Personnel
The Baseball Project
Steve Wynn – vocals, guitars
Linda Pitmon – drums, percussion, vocals
Scott McCaughey – vocals, guitars, keyboards, bass, percussion
Peter Buck – bass, 12-string guitar

Guests
Craig Finn - lead vocal (4)
Ben Gibbard - backing vocals (8)
Robert Lloyd - piano (5, 7, 9, 12), organ (1, 7, 9 ,12)
Steve Berlin - baritone sax (3, 9), farfisa organ (5)
Chris Funk - dobro (11), banjo, (11, 13), lap steel, 12-string, tenor guitar (13)
Paul Brainard - pedal steel (6, 12, 13), trumpet (6)
John Moen - backing vocals (1, 13)
Ira Kaplan - guitar (6)
Rodrigo D'Erasmo - violin (7)

Production
Produced by The Baseball Project and Adam Selzer.
Recorded by Adam Selzer at Type Foundry, Portland OR.
Mixed by John Agnello at Headgear Studios, Brooklyn, NY
Additional recording by:
Scott McCaughey (The Record Room, Portland and Headgear, Brooklyn)
Kevin Jarvis (Sonic Boom Room, Venice CA)
and by Ben Gibbard, Chris Funk, Rodrigo D'Erasmo, and James McNew (various mystery locales)
Mastered by Greg Calbi at Sterling Sound NYC

References

External links
Homepage

2011 albums
The Baseball Project albums
Yep Roc Records albums